Ezhamkadalinakkare is a 1979 Indian Malayalam-language film, directed by I. V. Sasi and produced by N. G. John. The film stars K. R. Vijaya in the lead role, whereas supporting roles were played by Soman, Seema, Ravikumar, Vidhubala, P. Bhaskaran, Henry Marsal, Janardanan and Jo Washington. It is the first Malayalam film to be shot in North America, with Manhattan being one of its locations. The song "Suralokajaladhaara" was filmed near in Niagara Falls, Ontario, Canada. This film was a remake of the Tamil film Ore Vaanam Ore Bhoomi directed by I. V. Sasi.

Cast

M. G. Soman as Soman
K. R. Vijaya
Seema
Vidhubala
Ravikumar
Janardanan
Reena
Padmini
P. Bhaskaran
Henry Marsal
Jo Washington

Soundtrack
The music was composed by M. S. Viswanathan and the lyrics were written by P. Bhaskaran.

References

External links
 

1979 films
1970s Malayalam-language films
Films directed by I. V. Sasi
Films scored by M. S. Viswanathan
Films set in Ontario
Films set in Manhattan
Films shot in Ontario
Films shot in New York City
Films set in hospitals
Malayalam remakes of Tamil films
Indian films set in New York City